Polle was a Samtgemeinde ("collective municipality") in the district of Holzminden, in Lower Saxony, Germany. Its seat was in the village Polle. On 1 January 2010, it merged with the former Samtgemeinde Bodenwerder to form the new Samtgemeinde Bodenwerder-Polle.

The Samtgemeinde Polle consisted of the following municipalities:

 Brevörde 
 Heinsen 
 Ottenstein
 Polle
 Vahlbruch

Former Samtgemeinden in Lower Saxony